Sergej Moya (born 14 January 1987 in Berlin) is a German actor, screenwriter and director. He won the Undine Award for Best Young Leading Actor in the 2005 film Keller – Teenage Wasteland.

Early life
Moya was born in Prenzlauer Berg, Berlin. He went to six different schools including the Berlin State Ballet School, and went to school in the US for half a year in 2005. Moya started his film career during his early teens, while at comprehensive school in Mitte, Berlin. He left school before Grade 10, due to having to travel and stay away for periods of time to make films, such as "The Angel Tonight" in Munich for 14 days in 2006. He received a scholarship from the Berenberg Bank Foundation in 2006 to further his acting development. He went to a workshop at the Stella Adler Studio of Acting in New York.

Acting career
Sergei Moya's first acting role aged 12, was in 2001 in the German movie Female 2 Seeks Happy End with Ben Becker. There followed a small role in the remake of the Erich Kästner 's novel Emil and the Detectives. The acting breakthrough came in 2003 alongside Götz George and Klaus J. Behrendt in the multi-awarded (Emmy and a Grimme Award,) WDR television movie Mein Vater. In 2005, he once again acted beside Götz George in a Schimanski episode.

In the Sat.1 series, he played a case for the Old Fox, as the son of Walter Sittler and then in the ARD series Commissario Laurenti, he was alongside of Henry Hübchen. For his role in Keller - Teenage Wasteland, Moya received the 2006 Undine Award for best actor in a feature film. In 2006, he was next to Uwe Ochsenknecht in Der beste Lehrer der Welt. In 2007, he was nominated for a Golden Romy as "Most Popular Shooting Star". Moya has no degree and has been focusing on acting since the beginning of 2006. He has appeared in several TV series such as Polizeiruf 110, Commissario Laurenti, Der Alte and several Tatort episodes.

Career as a director and screenwriter
He founded a film company, Von Fiessbach Film, with his girlfriend and producer Julia Lischinski, and friend Sascha Pollack.

Since 2009, Moya has also worked as a director and author. His short film Hollywood Drama was part of the competition at the film festival Max Ophüls Preis 2010 and was shown in the Perspektive Deutsches Kino series of the Berlinale 2010. His film project Hotel Desire, an erotic film with Clemens Schick and Saralisa Volm, was funded by crowdfunding. The sum of 170,000 euros was collected before the official deadline of 80 days. The later found the budget of $241,000 to complete the film.

In 2014, the 26-year-old Moya directed a TV film, about actor Jan Josef Liefers, Jan Josef Liefers - soundtrack of my life on the MDR channel . Tatjana Kerschbaumer noted in Tagesspiegel about the film, "Rarely has it been possible to summarize the biography of a person, music history and politics in such a condensed and anything but tenuous way".

Awards
 2005 - (Austrian Media Prize) Undine Award for Best Young Leading Actor in the film Keller – Teenage Wasteland
 2008 - "Best Actor" at the Madrid Mostoles International Film Festival 
 2009 - Moya received the Max Ophüls Award for "Best Newcomer"

Filmography

Film

Television

(as) Director

References

External links 
 

1987 births
Living people
German male film actors
Male actors from Berlin
German male television actors